Richard Tooley (November 25, 1820 – February 28, 1910) was an Ontario farmer and political figure. He represented Middlesex East in the Legislative Assembly of Ontario from 1871 to 1883 and from 1886 to 1894 as a member of the Conservative party.

He was born in Devonshire, England in 1820 and came to Middlesex County in Canada West in 1855. He served on the town council for North Dorchester Township from 1863 to 1870 and was county warden in 1870. He was elected to the provincial assembly as a Conservative in 1871. He resigned in 1883 but ran again in 1886.

External links 

The History of the County of Middlesex, Canada, D. Brock & M. Moon (1889)''

1820 births
1910 deaths
Progressive Conservative Party of Ontario MPPs